John Robert Hedley (born 1923) was an English footballer who played as a full-back for Sunderland between 1950 and 1959 whom he joined from Everton.

External links
 Post War English & Scottish Football League A - Z Player's Transfer Database - Jack Hedley Profile

1923 births
1985 deaths
English footballers
Association football fullbacks
North Shields F.C. players
Everton F.C. players
Sunderland A.F.C. players
Gateshead F.C. players